Middle Third or Middlethird is a barony in County Waterford, Ireland.

Etymology

A "third" (trian) was an old Irish land division of variable extent. The other "thirds" were Upperthird and Gaultier.

Geography
Middle Third is located in the east of County Waterford, south of the River Suir and west of Gaultier. It contains the stretch of coastline from Tramore Bay to Dunabrattin Head.

It also contains Bilberry Rock, site of a feral goat herd for centuries.

History
Middle Third was a barony by 1672.

Some of Middle Third was anciently part of the Viscount Doneraile's estate. The western part formed part of Paoracha, "Powers' Country."

List of settlements

Below is a list of settlements in Middle Third barony:

Annestown
Fenor
Kilmeadan  
Tramore

References

Baronies of County Waterford